Mitochondrial fission regulator 1 like is a protein that in humans is encoded by the MTFR1L gene.

References

Further reading